The term Hipo may refer to:

 Hippopotamus
 Hilfspolizei, an auxiliary police force
 HIPO model, a 1970s tool for planning and documenting a computer program
 289 HiPo, a Ford Windsor engine
 HIPO Corps, a Danish auxiliary police corps established by the German gestapo
 Hip-O Records, part of Universal Music Group

See also 
 Hippo (disambiguation)
 Hypo (disambiguation)